Second Lieutenant Edward Felix Baxter VC (18 September 1885 – 18 April 1916) was a British Army soldier and an English recipient of the Victoria Cross (VC), the highest and most prestigious award for gallantry in the face of the enemy that can be awarded to British and Commonwealth forces.

Early life
Felix Baxter was born in Oldswinford near Stourbridge in Worcestershire, the son of Charles and Beatrice (née Sparrow). He worked as a tutor.  He competed in the 1910 Isle of Man TT Races and crashed on lap 4 at Ballacraine. The resulting damage to the front forks of his motor-cycle caused his retirement from the race.

First World War
Baxter was a second lieutenant in the 1/8th Battalion, The King's (Liverpool) Regiment, British Army during the First World War when the following deed took place for which he was awarded the VC.  The citation appeared in a supplement to the London Gazette of 26 September 1916:

He is buried at Row A, Grave 10, in the Fillievres British Cemetery, France, located 8 miles south west of Hesdin.
His Victoria Cross is displayed in the Lord Ashcroft Gallery in the Imperial War Museum in London.

References

External links

Biography

1885 births
1916 deaths
Burials in France
People from Stourbridge
British Army personnel of World War I
British World War I recipients of the Victoria Cross
British military personnel killed in World War I
King's Regiment (Liverpool) officers
Isle of Man TT riders
People educated at Christ's Hospital
English motorcycle racers
British Army recipients of the Victoria Cross
Military personnel from Worcestershire